Yên Phong is a rural district of Bắc Ninh province in the Red River Delta region of Vietnam. As of 2003 the district had a population of 146,040. The district covers an area of 113 km². The district capital lies at Chờ.

References

Districts of Bắc Ninh province